Anything is a 2017 American romantic drama film directed and written by Timothy McNeil and starring John Carroll Lynch and Matt Bomer. The film is based on a play that the director had performed in December 2007 with the Elephant Theater Company in Los Angeles and that he also adapted for the film. It also stars Maura Tierney, Margot Bingham, Michael Boatman, Tanner Buchanan and Micah Hauptman in supporting roles.

The film was released at the LA Film Festival on June 17, 2017. It was released on May 11, 2018 by Great Point Media.

Plot 
Early Landry is a Mississippi widower reeling from the recent death of his wife. After a suicide attempt, he relocates to Los Angeles to be closer to his overprotective but well-intentioned sister, Laurette, and her family. He soon moves into an apartment of his own. In time, he is both equally intimidated and charmed by his Hollywood neighbors, especially Freda Von Rhenburg, a transgender sex worker. Before long, Early and Freda bond over their shared loneliness and past traumas, sparking a friendship and, eventually, a tentative romance.

Cast 
 John Carroll Lynch as Early Landry
 Matt Bomer as Freda Von Rhenburg
 Maura Tierney as Laurette Sachman
 Margot Bingham as Brianna
 Michael Boatman as Charles
 Tanner Buchanan as Jack Sachman
 Micah Hauptman as David

Release 
The film had its premiere at the Los Angeles Film Festival on June 17, 2017.

Reception

Critical response 
On review aggregator website Rotten Tomatoes, the film has an approval rating of 64% based on 22 reviews, with a weighted average of 6.03/10. In Metacritic, the film has a rating of 60 out of 100, based on 10 reviews, indicating "mixed or average reviews".

Awards and nominations

References

External links
 

2017 films
2017 independent films
2017 LGBT-related films
2017 romantic drama films
American films based on plays
American independent films
American LGBT-related films
American romantic drama films
2010s English-language films
Films about widowhood
Films set in Los Angeles
LGBT-related romantic drama films
Films about trans women
Casting controversies in film
LGBT-related controversies in film
2010s American films